Astatine iodide is an interhalogen compound with the chemical formula AtI. It is the second heaviest known interhalogen compound, after iodine tribromide.

Production

Astatine iodide is produced by the direct combination of astatine and iodine in a 1:1 molar ratio:

2 At + I2 → 2 AtI

References

Bibliography
 

Interhalogen compounds
Diatomic molecules
Astatine compounds
Iodine compounds